Dawsonville is an unincorporated community in Nodaway County, in the U.S. state of Missouri.

History
Dawsonville was laid out in 1879, and named after Lafe Dawson, an early settler.  Variant names were "City Bluff", "Dawson", and "Halsas Ferry". A post office called Dawson was established in 1880, and remained in operation until 1904.

References

Unincorporated communities in Nodaway County, Missouri
Unincorporated communities in Missouri